Arterolane, also known as OZ277 or RBx 11160, is a substance that was tested for antimalarial activity by Ranbaxy Laboratories. It was discovered by US and European scientists who were coordinated by the Medicines for Malaria Venture (MMV). Its molecular structure is uncommon for pharmacological compounds in that it has both an ozonide (trioxolane) group and an adamantane substituent.

Initial results were disappointing, and in 2007 MMV withdrew support, after having invested $20M in the research; Ranbaxy said at the time that it intended to continue developing the drug combination on its own. Ranbaxy started a Phase II clinical trial of arterolane, in combination with piperaquine in 2009 that published in 2015.

In 2012, Ranbaxy obtained approval to market the arterolane/piperaquine combination drug in India, under the brand name Synriam, and in 2014 received approval to market it in Nigeria, Uganda, Senegal, Cameroon, Guinea, Kenya and Ivory Coast; it had already received approval in Uganda.

References 

Antimalarial agents
Adamantanes
Organic peroxides
Spiro compounds
Carboxamides
Amines
Cyclohexanes